The Santiago is the women's volleyball team of Santiago.

History
The team was founded in 2007. They claimed the 2017 North Central ligue championship, after defeating La Vega in the final series; Angélica Hinojosa and Celenia Toribio were the key players for the victory.

Current volleyball squad
As of December 2008

Coach:  Héctor Rodríguez

Assistant coach:  Roberto Balbuena

Palmares

National competition 
National league: 

2007 - 3rd Place
2008 - 3rd Place

References
League Official website

Dominican Republic volleyball clubs
Volleyball clubs established in 2007